The Encyclopedia of Motherhood is a comprehensive, specialized encyclopedia of all issues relevant to motherhood, to be published by SAGE Publications in three volumes (700 entries) in April 2010. Its General Editor is Andrea O'Reilly.

References

English-language encyclopedias
Motherhood
Works about parenting
Encyclopedias of sexuality
Encyclopedias of medicine